Liberty Residential Historic District is a national historic district located at Liberty, Union County, Indiana.  The district encompasses 67 contributing buildings in a predominantly residential section of Liberty.  It developed between about 1841 and 1920 and includes representative examples of Greek Revival, Italianate, Queen Anne, Colonial Revival, Bungalow / American Craftsman, and Ranch style architecture. Notable contributing buildings include the First Presbyterian Church (1889), Union County Public (Carnegie) Library (1915), John S. Nixon House (1879), John B. Macy House (1876), and Union County Seminary (1841).

It was listed on the National Register of Historic Places in 2013.

See also
Liberty Courthouse Square Historic District

References

Historic districts on the National Register of Historic Places in Indiana
Greek Revival architecture in Indiana
Italianate architecture in Indiana
Queen Anne architecture in Indiana
Colonial Revival architecture in Indiana
Bungalow architecture in Indiana
Historic districts in Union County, Indiana
National Register of Historic Places in Union County, Indiana